, née , was a Japanese social worker and politician who was a member of the House of Councillors.

Biography
She graduated from the Nara Girl's Higher Normal School Natural History Department in March 1914, and she later became an assistant teacher at her alma mater.

From 1920 until 1923 she studied child protection issues at the Ohara Institute for Social Research. In 1922, the same year the shōnenhō was enacted, she traveled to the United States on behalf of the Ministry of Education, Science, Sports and Culture and the Ministry of Justice to study child protection projects. After returning to Japan, he became Japan's first female probation officer at the Tokyo juvenile court.

She was elected to the House of Councillors national district in the 1947 Japanese House of Councillors election, and was a member of Ryokufūkai. She was re-elected in the 1953 Japanese House of Councillors election, and she devoted her efforts to the enactment of the Prostitution Prevention Law. She was a member of the committees for Central Youth Affairs, Prostitution Countermeasures, and Rehabilitation and Protection, and she was also the Chairman of the House of Councillors Library. She was the director of the Judicial Protection Association and of the Japan Women's Social Education Association. She was a member of the Kyoritsu Women's University board of trustees.

In 1957, she heard Westminster Quarters while in England, and she came up with the idea of giving "mother bells" as presents; by 1959, she had installed them in sixty-four locations across Japan, including juvenile institutions and women's guidance homes.

Miyagi Tamayo died on 19 November 1960.

Bibliography

References

1892 births
1960 deaths
Japanese activists
Female members of the House of Councillors (Japan)
Members of the House of Councillors (Japan)
Hosei University
Politicians from Yamaguchi Prefecture
Japanese women activists
20th-century Japanese politicians
20th-century Japanese women politicians